Kukna Ajay Singh (born 13 December 1996) is an Indian first-class cricketer who plays for Rajasthan. He made his Twenty20 debut on 2 January 2016 in the 2015–16 Syed Mushtaq Ali Trophy.

References

External links
 

1996 births
Living people
Indian cricketers
Rajasthan cricketers
People from Rajasthan